Toy is the thirteenth studio album by the Swiss electronic duo Yello. It was released on 30 September 2016 on Universal Music.

In order to promote the album, Yello performed four sold-out shows at Berlin's Kraftwerk during the last week of October 2016, their first live shows ever.

Reception
A reviewer of Mixmag stated, "On this showing, they’re just as weird and just as wonderful as ever. The first thing that’s noticeable is just how inventive Blank’s synth work still is: whether for floating sunrise ballads, darkly rippling ambient pieces or pumping glam-pop, his sounds bubble and blurt in super surprising ways." Ben Hogwood of musicOMH wrote, " Their latest return from the wilderness feels as though in the wake of a long absence, but in reality the duo have kept at close quarters, plotting their next album even while pursuing solo ventures. And here it is, the brightly coloured Toy – where after a brief intro we alight on planet Yello with some vintage Meier vocals, given from the soles of his boots." A review by the Record Collector commented, "Dieter Meier’s vocals are a little grizzled but retain their dark chocolate vibes. He’s the bohemian who’s seen it all but can’t stop partying, reflecting this in the lyrics. He does however need a few disco naps, these being filled adequately by party guests." Chris Todd of The Line of Best Fit noted, "It all results in their strongest album for over two decades... they're one of those acts who, despite sounding the same throughout their career, have managed to avoid ever sound boring."

Track listing

Standard edition

Deluxe edition

Personnel
Band
Jeremy Baer – guitar
Boris Blank – vocals
Heidi Happy – vocals
Malia – vocals
Dieter Meier – vocals
Fifi Rong – vocals
Production
Helen Sobiralski – photography
Martin Wanner – photography
Ursli Webser – mastering

Charts

Weekly charts

Year-end charts

References

2016 albums
Yello albums
Universal Records albums